Krasen Trifonov (Bulgarian: Красен Трифонов; born 5 December 1983) is a Bulgarian football midfielder who plays for Pavlikeni.

Career
Trifonov spent four seasons at Lokomotiv Gorna Oryahovitsa but was released in July 2017. In June 2018, he returned to the club following a short stint at Pavlikeni.

References

External links
 

1983 births
Living people
People from Pavlikeni
Bulgarian footballers
Association football midfielders
First Professional Football League (Bulgaria) players
Second Professional Football League (Bulgaria) players
FC Chernomorets Burgas players
FC Spartak Plovdiv players
PFC Lokomotiv Plovdiv players
PFC Nesebar players
FC Etar 1924 Veliko Tarnovo players
FC Lokomotiv Gorna Oryahovitsa players
Sportspeople from Veliko Tarnovo Province